Dare I Say... is the second studio album by stoner rock band Hermano. It was released on the MeteorCity label and produced by the band and executive producer Ram Lauwrier.  Since the band members lived in different locations, the album was recorded in various studios.

Track listing

Personnel

Band
 John Garcia – vocals
 David Angstrom – guitar, vocals
 Dandy Brown – bass, additional guitars, organ
 Chris Leathers – drums

Additional personnel
 Aleah X – additional vocals on "Quite Fucked", "Let's Get It On"
 Steve Feldman – additional vocals on "Roll Over", "Is This O.K.?", "Brother Bjork", "Murder One", "Angry American"
 Mark Engel – guitar on "Murder One"
 Eric Belt – guitar on "Angry American" and "Life"

Mixing
 James Salter, Berkley Park Studio, Atlanta, Georgia, USA
 Jacques De Haard, Waterfront Studios, Rotterdam, Netherlands

Mastering
 Alan Ward, Electric City, Brussels, Belgium

Notes
The album was recorded across multiple studios due to the band members living in differing locations.

References

Hermano (band) albums
2005 albums